The men's marathon at the 2022 European Athletics Championships took place at the streets of Munich on 15 August.

Records

Schedule

Results
The race started at 11:30 CEST.

References

Marathon M
Marathons at the European Athletics Championships
Marathons in Germany
2022 marathons